Yume Ippai (ゆめいっぱい, "Full of Dreams") is a song covered by  as her debut single on April 21, 1990... The lyrics were written by Aran Tomoko and the melody was composed by Tetsuro Oda. It was used as the first opening theme of the anime series Chibi Maruko-chan from January 7, 1990 to September 27, 1992.  "Yume Ippai" was the only song that Sakura Momoko did not write lyrics for in the anime series. The song was used once again on December 15, 1990 as the ending soundtrack for Chibi Maruko-chan: The Movie. At its peak, the song placed 50th on the Oricon Singles charts during the 1990s. After the death of Sakura Momoko in 2018, "Yume Ippai" rose to 132nd place on the chart that week.

Album 

 "Yume Ippai" ("Full of Dreams") Lyrics: Aran Tomoko, Composition: Tetsuro Oda
 "Mou Oyasuminasai" (I'll Say Good Night Again") Composition: Yumiko Seki

Covers 

 In 1990, B. B. Queens, which sang "Odoru Ponpokorin", covered "Yume Ippai" for their album's B-side
 Golden Bombers, which also covered "Odoru Ponpokorin" for the anime series Chibi Maruko-chan in 2016, also sang "Yume Ippai" for their B-side
 On Mother's Day 2020, Rakuten released a commercial covering the song. In an interview, Yumiko (Seki) Arima sang "Yume Ippai" for the first time in 29 years. The song was featured in the opening car radio scene, and served as the primary music of the commercial.

References 

1990 songs
1990 debut singles
Anime songs